The  Detroit Lions season was their 37th in the league. The team failed to improve on their previous season's output of 6–7–1, winning only four games. They missed the playoffs for the ninth straight season and incurred their second losing record in a row.

Roster

Schedule 

Game summaries

Week 1

Standings

References 

Detroit Lions seasons
Detroit Lions
Detroit Lions